Palaua is a genus of very small air-breathing land snails, terrestrial pulmonate gastropod mollusks in the family Euconulidae, the hive snails. This genus is endemic to Palau.

Species 
Species within the genus Palaua include:
 Palaua babelthuapi
 Palaua margaritacea
 Palaua minor
 Palaua ngarduaisi
 Palaua straminea
 Palaua wilsoni

References

External links

 
Endemic fauna of Palau
Molluscs of Oceania
Molluscs of the Pacific Ocean
Taxonomy articles created by Polbot